The 2020 Texas A&M Aggies softball team represents Texas A&M University in the 2020 NCAA Division I softball season. The Aggies play their home games at Davis Diamond.

Previous season

The Aggies finished the 2019 season 28–27 overall, and 6–18 in the SEC to finish last in the conference. The Aggies went 0–2 in the Austin Regional during the 2019 NCAA Division I softball tournament.

Preseason

SEC preseason poll
The SEC preseason poll was released on January 15, 2020.

Schedule and results

Source:
*Rankings are based on the team's current ranking in the NFCA poll.

Rankings

References

Texas A&M
Texas A&M Aggies softball seasons
Texas A&M Aggies softball